Statistics of Kuwaiti Premier League in the 1973–74 season.

Overview
Al Kuwait Kaifan won the championship.

References
RSSSF

1973–74
1973–74 in Asian association football leagues
football